North Pass is a mountain pass over the Continental Divide in Saguache County, Colorado. The pass is traversed by Colorado State Highway 114 between Saguache to the southeast and Gunnison to the northwest. The route is an all-weather paved road.

References

Mountain passes of Colorado
Landforms of Saguache County, Colorado
Transportation in Saguache County, Colorado